Shearling is a skin from a recently shorn sheep or lamb that has been tanned and dressed with the wool left on. It has a suede surface on one side and a clipped fur surface on the other. Usually the suede side is worn outward. Real shearling breathes and is more flexible, much heavier in weight and the fur is much denser than synthetic. Synthetic shearling fur is  typically called sherpa. Synthetic or fake shearling has a bit of a sheen to its outer side while real shearling outer hide is dull and a bit tacky to the touch. Genuine shearling is also smoother to the touch than synthetic shearling.

References

Sheep
Hides (skin)
Winter fabrics